Jeff Sullivan may refer to:

Jeff Sullivan (politician) (1904–1962), former Lieutenant Governor for the Commonwealth of Massachusetts
Jeff Sullivan (Futura) of Futura

See also
Jeffrey Sullivan (disambiguation)
Geoff Sullivan (disambiguation)